Podlesny is a rural locality (a settlement) in Klyukvinsky Selsoviet Rural Settlement, Kursky District, Kursk Oblast, Russia. Population:

Geography 
The settlement is located 99 km from the Russia–Ukraine border, 4 km east of the district center – the town Kursk, 2.5 km from the selsoviet center – Dolgoye.

 Climate
Podlesny has a warm-summer humid continental climate (Dfb in the Köppen climate classification).

Transport 
Podlesny is located on the federal route  (Kursk – Voronezh –  "Kaspy" Highway; a part of the European route ), 4 km from the nearest railway station Klyukva (railway line Klyukva–Belgorod).

The rural locality is situated 3.5 km from Kursk Vostochny Airport, 120 km from Belgorod International Airport and 201 km from Voronezh Peter the Great Airport.

References

Notes

Sources

Rural localities in Kursky District, Kursk Oblast